This was the first edition of the tournament.

Paolo Lorenzi won the title after defeating Daniel Gimeno Traver 7–6(7–2), 6–7(5–7), 6–3 in the final.

Seeds

Draw

Finals

Top half

Bottom half

References

Sources
Main Draw
Qualifying Draw

Sopot Open - Singles